Jonathan Corbblah (born October 21, 1979) is an American game show competitor and USCF expert chess player. At one point in 2013, his regular rating came within one point (2199) of him achieving the coveted master title.  His game show debut was in 1991 at age 12, when he appeared on Where in The World is Carmen Sandiego?. He has appeared on 13 game show programs and NPR radio show Ask Me Another.

Corbblah co-hosted two chess entertainment programs, America's Next Chess Star and the Extreme Chess Championship with US Women's Chess Champion Jennifer Shahade. Corbblah coaches chess for national champions PS 166 and the Trinity School.

References 

1979 births
Living people
American chess players
Jeopardy! contestants
People from Brooklyn